Vanthoor, Van  Thoor is a surname. Notable people with the surname include:

Dries Vanthoor (born 1998), Belgian racing driver, brother of Laurens
Laurens Vanthoor (born 1991), Belgian racing driver

Dutch-language surnames